Cowens is a surname. Notable people with the surname include:

Al Cowens (1951–2002), American baseball player
Dave Cowens (born 1948), American basketball player and coach

See also
Cowen (surname)